Yolanda is a 1924 American silent historical drama film produced by William Randolph Hearst (through his Cosmopolitan Productions) and starring Marion Davies. Robert G. Vignola directed as he had Enchantment (1921) and several other Davies costume films. The film began production as a Metro-Goldwyn film, with the company becoming Metro-Goldwyn-Mayer in May 1924.

This was the second Marion Davies vehicle produced by Cosmopolitan from a Charles Major novel, the first being the phenomenally successful (and expensive) When Knighthood Was in Flower in 1922. Unlike Knighthood, Yolanda was not financially successful.

Plot
As described in a film magazine review, Princess Mary of Burgundy is informed by her father the Duke that she is to marry Maximillian of Styria. Presents are exchanged. The Princess incognito goes to the silk fair and meets and falls in love with a knight who proves to be Maximillian. The later is thrown into the castle dungeon by conspirators and is about to be executed when saved through the intervention of the Princess. Through evil influences the Duke is induced to change his mind regarding a son-in-law and transfers the alliance to one with the half-witted son of the French king. Mary is given over to the care of the French court. Maximillian rescues her and, following the death of the Duke in a battle with the Swiss, is chosen to lead the Burgundians. The wedding of Maximillian and Mary is announced.

Cast

Marion Davies as Princess Mary / Yolanda
Lyn Harding as Charles the Bold, Duke of Burgundy
Holbrook Blinn as King Louis XI of France
Maclyn Arbuckle as Bishop La Balue
Johnny Dooley as The Dauphin
Arthur Donaldson as Lord Bishop
Ralph Graves as Maximillian of Styria
Ian Maclaren as Campo Basse
Gustav von Seyffertitz as Oliver de Daim
Theresa Maxwell Conover as Queen Margaret
Martin Faust as Count Galli
Thomas Findley as Antoinette's father
Paul McAllister as Jules d'Humbercourt
Leon Errol as Innkeeper
Mary Kennedy as Antoinette Castleman

unbilled
Roy Applegate as Sir Karl Pitti
Arthur Tovey 
Kit Wain as Peasant boy

Production
In her 18th film, Marion Davies starred in a dual role: as Princess Mary of Burgundy and as Yolanda. Joseph Urban designed the mammoth sets which covered a city block on 2nd Avenue in New York. Exhibitors Herald reported it was the largest movie set ever built on the East Coast. This was the final Davies film Robert G. Vignola directed. This was also the only pairing of Davies and Ralph Graves. While the film did well in big cities, that success did not extend to small towns and the film was generally considered a failure. It was just too similar to When Knighthood Was in Flower.

Preservation
Yolanda is extant at Cinematheque de Belgique and the Museum of Modern Art and a trailer survives at the Library of Congress.

References

External links

Lobby poster for Yolanda (Wayback Machine)
Colorful advert (Wayback Machine)
Still at silenthollywood.com

1924 films
American silent feature films
Films directed by Robert G. Vignola
Films based on American novels
Metro-Goldwyn-Mayer films
American black-and-white films
American historical drama films
1920s historical drama films
Films set in France
Films set in the 15th century
Cultural depictions of Charles the Bold
Cultural depictions of Louis XI of France
1924 drama films
1920s American films
Silent American drama films